Sonbol may refer to:

People
 Said Sonbol (1929–2004), Egyptian writer
 Sherif Sonbol (b. 1956), Egyptian photographer

Places
 Sonbol, Razavi Khorasan, a village in Razavi Khorasan Province, Iran